This is a list of the Americas rapid transit systems by ridership. These heavy rail or rapid transit systems are also known as metro or subway systems. This list of systems in the Americas does not include light rail, even when they are integrated with heavy rail. Daily and annual ridership figures are based on "average weekday unlinked passenger trips" (where transfers between lines are counted as two separate passenger "boardings" or "trips"), unless otherwise indicated (e.g., Mexico City and Monterrey, whose figures are the average for all days, not just weekdays). For metro systems in the United States (including Puerto Rico) and Canada, the annual ridership figures for 2019 and average weekday ridership figures for the Fourth Quarter (Q4) of 2019 come from the American Public Transportation Association's (APTA) ridership reports statistics, unless otherwise noted. Ridership figures for Mexico come from Banco de Información Económica's INEGI reports for the year 2014. Ridership figures for the Dominican Republic come from the Directorate of Operations Santo Domingo Metro report for the year 2013.


Rail transport-related lists

Notes

References 

es:Anexo:Sistemas de metro en América